Kalateh-ye Hajji Barat (also Romanized as Kalāteh-ye Ḩājjī Barāt) is a village in Qasabeh-ye Sharqi Rural District, in the Central District of Sabzevar County, Razavi Khorasan Province, Iran. At the 2006 census, its population was 12, in 4 families.

References 

Populated places in Sabzevar County